Ronald Brooks Cameron (August 16, 1927 – February 1, 2006) was an American lawyer and politician who served two terms as a U.S. Representative from California's 25th congressional district from 1963 to 1967.

Biography
Born in Kansas City, Missouri, Cameron graduated from Western Reserve Academy, Hudson, Ohio, 1945.
He attended Case Western Reserve University, Cleveland, Ohio from 1946 to 1947, and UCLA from 1949 to 1953.  He received a J.D., Pepperdine University School of Law, Malibu, California, 1973.
He was in the United States Marine Corps from 1945 to 1946.

Cameron became a certified public accountant in 1954.  He served as member of the California State Assembly from 1958 to 1962, and was delegate to the 1960 and 1964 Democratic National Conventions.

Cameron was elected as a Democrat to the eighty-eighth  Congress (January 3, 1963 – January 3, 1967).  He was defeated for reelection to the ninetieth Congress in 1966.  He resumed practice as an accountant and attorney.  In 1970, he was the Democratic nominee for California state comptroller.

He died on February 1, 2006, in Whittier, California.

References

External links
 Join California Ronald Brooks Cameron

1927 births
2006 deaths
Democratic Party members of the United States House of Representatives from California
United States Marines
Democratic Party members of the California State Assembly
Case Western Reserve University alumni
University of California, Los Angeles alumni
Pepperdine University School of Law alumni
20th-century American politicians
Western Reserve Academy alumni